Professor Ibrahim Haruna Lipumba (born 6 June 1952 in Ilolangulu, Tanganyika Territory) is a Tanzanian economist and  politician He served as the National Chairman of the opposition Civic United Front (CUF) party from 1995 until his resignation in August 2015.

Early life and career
Lipumba was born in Tabora Region in present-day Tanzania. He was educated at the Swedish Free Mission Primary School (1959–1962), L.A Upper Primary School (1962–66), Tabora Boys Secondary School (1967–70) and Pugu Secondary School (1971–72). He then joined the University of Dar es Salaam in 1973 and graduated with a BA in Economics in 1976. He received his MA in economics from the same university in 1978. He thereafter enrolled at Stanford University in 1978 to pursue his doctoral studies and received his PhD in economics in 1983.

He is a prominent scholar (professor of economics). He has held a number of positions in the field of education, as a university professor both in the United States and at home; and as a freelance economist. He was the economic adviser to the Ugandan government in the late 1980s and early 1990s.

Political career

Professor Lipumba has held the position of Chairman of Tanzania's main opposition party, the Civic United Front from 1995 to present day. He has also contested every presidential election in Tanzania since the country instituted a multiparty system in the early 1990s. In the first election in 1995, he placed third and won 6.43% of the vote. He finished second behind incumbent President Benjamin Mkapa in 2000, capturing 16.26% of the vote.

Running again as the CUF presidential candidate in the 2005 elections, Lipumba finished a distant second to Jakaya Kikwete of the ruling Chama Cha Mapinduzi (CCM) party winning 11.68% of the vote. He came in third in the 2010 presidential election receiving 8.3% of the vote.

Professor Lipumba is a skilled orator drawing large crowds  for his rallies; he is also an intellectual at heart and continues his career as a freelance economist albeit on a smaller scale due to political commitments.

Personal life
Professor Lipumba is a keen sportsman, having played football competitively in secondary school before a knee injury forced him to retire from the game; he is an avid football fan of Taifa Stars, Tanzania's national football team, and Arsenal Football Club. He is a married, family man.

References

External links

1952 births
Living people
People from Tabora Region
Civic United Front politicians
Pugu Secondary School alumni
Tabora Boys Secondary School alumni
University of Dar es Salaam alumni
Stanford University alumni